Harrison Eiteljorg (October 1, 1903, in Indianapolis – April 29, 1997, in Indianapolis) was an American philanthropist, businessman, and patron of the arts. The Eiteljorg Museum of American Indians and Western Art was named after him for his donation of visual arts by indigenous peoples of the Americas and Western American paintings and sculptures. Until his death in 1997, Eiteljorg served as chairman of the museum's board.

Eiteljorg was for several years a successful businessman in the mining industry. He served as board chair for the Indianapolis Museum of Art and also donated 1,200 pieces of African art and artifacts to their collection in 1989. There is also a collection of African art donated by Eiteljorg at Butler University in Indianapolis.

He married Edith Morgan Eiteljorg.

References

External links
 

1903 births
American patrons of the arts
1997 deaths
People from Indianapolis
20th-century American philanthropists